Port Elliot is a town in South Australia toward the eastern end of the south coast of the Fleurieu Peninsula. It is situated on the sheltered Horseshoe Bay, a small bay off the much larger Encounter Bay. Pullen Island lies outside the mouth of the bay.

Lady Bay is a small bay at the south-western end of Horseshoe Bay, past the jetty.

History 
Horseshoe Bay was proclaimed a port in 1851, and the settlement above the bay was named Port Elliot in 1852 after Charles Elliot, the Governor of Bermuda who was a friend of the then Governor of South Australia, Sir Henry Young. The location had been previously known as Freeman's Knob; the aboriginal name for the area may have been "Witengangool".

Freemans Nob was used as a lookout post for shore-base bay whaling stations in Encounter Bay in the late 1830s. The area was also used as a place to launch boats in 1842 for Hargan and Hart's whaling station at Rosetta Head.

The port was established to provide a safe seaport for the Murray river trade which terminated at Goolwa as the Murray Mouth was deemed too treacherous and unpredictable for safe navigation. Goods and passengers were carried between Goolwa and Port Elliot on the first public railway in Australia completed in 1854.

The government works to establish the port included Australia's first reticulated water supply, from wells at Waterport (about 1 km north of the bay) to tanks above the jetty which provided fresh water for ships as well as for the town. In 1864 after a number of disastrous shipping losses in Horseshoe Bay the railway was extended to Victor Harbor which provided safer access for ships. Port Elliot's role as a port ended, with the bay and jetty being left to the fishermen and beachgoers. The importance of the rail link between the river and the sea soon also ended with the building of a railway between Adelaide and Morgan which enabled river traffic to offload freight and passengers over  further upstream and rail them directly to Adelaide. The towns of the southern Fleurieu coast – Victor Harbor, Port Elliot, Middleton and Goolwa – were spared any further commercial or industrial development, and became a popular holiday destination with many guest houses, camping parks and 'weekender' houses and shacks. The nearby early subdivisions of Waterport, Louisville, Findon, Ville St.Louis and Elliot Town are now all considered part of Port Elliot.

The beaches of Port Elliot and Victor Harbour have been facing rising seas and more has to be done to stop this.

Recent times 

Today, Port Elliot is a quiet township with two hotels, three churches, six coffee shops, no fast food chains, and is a popular holiday destination close enough to Adelaide for day trippers and even commuters. The continuing expansion of the Greater Adelaide metropolitan area together with ongoing improvements to the road links between the Fleurieu Peninsula and Adelaide has brought an influx of "seachange retirees", driving up house and land prices, and adversely affecting the ability of local young people and families to remain in the area. Employment prospects are largely limited to hospitality work, aged care and the building trades which continue to benefit from rapid growth in the region.

In 2007, Port Elliot became the focus of unwanted media attention due to the murder of 15-year-old Carly Ryan at Lady Bay. On 21 January 2010, a 50-year-old man from Victoria was found guilty of the murder while his son was found not guilty.

Little penguin colony 
Little penguins once bred at Freeman's Knob. In 1981 a dog attack left at least 10 adult penguins dead and numerous eggs broken and empty. It was posited that this event may have rendered the colony extinct.

References

External links 

 Street Map

Further reading 
Perkins, John, (1988), The Shipwrecks of Port Elliot 1853–1864, Society for Underwater Historical Research, North Adelaide, SA.

Coastal towns in South Australia
Fleurieu Peninsula